Carenum cognatum is a species of ground beetle in the subfamily Scaritinae. It was described by Sloane in 1895.

References

cavipenne
Beetles described in 1895